The Kashmiris in Punjab are ethnic Kashmiris who have historically migrated from the Kashmir Valley and settled in the Punjab region. Many ethnic Kashmiri Muslims from the Kashmir Valley had migrated to the Punjab region during Dogra and Sikh rule.

History

Pre-independence
Heavy commodifications taxation under the Sikh rule caused many Kashmiri peasants to migrate to the plains of Punjab.  These claims, made in Kashmiri histories, were corroborated by European travelers. When one such European traveller, Moorcroft, left the Valley in 1823, about 500 emigrants accompanied him across the Pir Panjal Pass. The 1833 famine resulted in many people leaving the Kashmir Valley and migrating to the Punjab, with the majority of weavers leaving Kashmir. Weavers settled down for generations in the cities of Punjab such as Jammu and Nurpur. The 1833 famine led to a large influx of Kashmiris into Amritsar. Kashmir's Muslims in particular suffered and had to leave Kashmir in large numbers, while Hindus were not much affected. The emigration during the Sikh rule resulted in Kashmiris enriching the culture and cuisines of Amritsar, Lahore and Rawalpindi. Sikh rule in Kashmir ended in 1846 and was followed by the rule of Dogra Hindu maharajahs who ruled Kashmir as part of their princely state of Jammu and Kashmir. 

A large number of Muslim Kashmiris migrated from the Kashmir Valley to the Punjab due to conditions in the princely state such as famine, extreme poverty and harsh treatment of Kashmiri Muslims by the Dogra Hindu regime. According to the 1911 Census there were 177,549 Kashmiri Muslims in the Punjab. With the inclusion of Kashmiri settlements in NWFP this figure rose to 206,180.

Scholar Ayesha Jalal states that Kashmiris faced discrimination in the Punjab as well. Kashmiris settled for generations in the Punjab were unable to own land, including the family of Muhammad Iqbal.  Scholar Chitralekha Zutshi states that Kashmiri Muslims settled in the Punjab retained emotional and familial links to Kashmir and felt obliged to struggle for the freedom of their brethren in the Valley.

Common krams (surnames) found amongst the Kashmiri Muslims who migrated from the Valley to the Punjab include Butt, Dar, Lone , Wain (Wani), Mir, Rathore.

Post-independence
Kashmiri Muslims constituted an important segment of several Punjabi cities such as Sialkot, Lahore, Amritsar and Ludhiana. Following the partition of India in 1947 and the subsequent communal unrest across Punjab, Muslim Kashmiris living in East Punjab migrated en masse to West Punjab. Kashmiri migrants from Amritsar have had a big influence on Lahore's contemporary cuisine and culture. The Kashmiris of Amritsar were more steeped in their Kashmiri culture than the Kashmiris of Lahore. Ethnic Kashmiris from Amritsar also migrated in large numbers to Rawalpindi, where Kashmiris had already introduced their culinary traditions during the British Raj.

An exclusive research conducted by the "Jang Group and Geo Television Network" showed that the Kashmiri community had been involved in spearheading the power politics of Lahore district since 1947. The Kashmiri diaspora in Punjab also influences politics in the Gujranwala, Gujrat and Sialkot districts.

Notable Kashmiris of Punjab

One of the most highly educated and prominent Kashmiris in Punjab was Muhammad Iqbal, whose poetry displayed a keen sense of belonging to Kashmir Valley. Another member of the Kashmiri diaspora in Punjab was the famous storywriter Saadat Hasan Manto who was proud of his Kashmiri ancestry. Notable members of the Kashmiri diaspora in Pakistan also include the former Prime Minister Nawaz Sharif (paternal ancestry from Anantnag), Finance Minister Ishaq Dar, and politician Khawaja Asif. The following is a list of notable Kashmiris of Punjab:

 A. K. Hangal, Indian freedom fighter and actor
 Allama Muhammad Iqbal, writer, philosopher and politician in British India
 Ali Azmat, Pakistani singer-songwriter, musician and actor
 Farhan Saeed, Pakistani actor and singer
 Great Gama, pehlwani wrestler and strongman in British India
 Ishaq Dar, Pakistani finance minister
 Ismat Beg, Pakistani mathematician and researcher
 Javid Iqbal, Pakistani philosopher and senior justice
 Khawaja Saad Rafique, Pakistani politician
 Mir Khalil ur Rehman, Pakistani newspaper entrepreneur and founder of the Jang Group
 Nida Dar, Pakistani cricketer
 P. N. Haksar, Indian bureaucrat and diplomat
 Saifuddin Kitchlew, Indian independence activist, barrister and politician 
 Salman Butt, Pakistani cricketer
 Salmaan Taseer, Pakistani politician and businessman, founder of Daily Times
 Sharif family, Pakistani political family
 Sikandar Raza, Pakistani-born Zimbabwean cricketer
 Swarup Rani Nehru, Indian independence activist and mother of Jawaharlal Nehru
 Tapishwar Narain Raina, Indian senior army officer and diplomat

See also

 Pathans of Punjab
 Baloch of Punjab
 Kashmiris in Azad Kashmir

References

Punjab
Kashmiri tribes
Punjabi tribes
Social groups of Punjab, Pakistan